Pageant is the second and final studio album by American queer punk duo Pwr Bttm. Originally released by Polyvinyl and Big Scary Monsters, the album's release was preceded by sexual abuse allegations against Pwr Bttm member Ben Hopkins. Both labels dropped the band from their rosters and ceased production and distribution of Pageant, providing refunds to those who pre-ordered the record. Pageant was also pulled from music streaming services. The album debuted on the UK Indie Chart on May 19, 2017, at no. 46.

Critical reception

On Metacritic, the album holds an average critic score of 85, based on 12 critics, indicating "universal acclaim".

With respect to the allegations of sexual abuse against band member Ben Hopkins, Sasha Geffen of Pitchfork commented on Pageant, saying, "What was a document of queer exuberance has now become a hollow sequence of songs, from a band whose sentiments were maybe always shallow."

Commercial performance
Pageant charted for one week at position 5 on the US Heatseekers Albums chart for the week of June 3, 2017. It also charted for one week at position 31 on the US Independent Albums chart for the week of June 3, 2017. In the UK, the album debuted on the Indie Chart on May 19, 2017 at position 46.

Track listing

Personnel
Credits adapted from Pageant album liner notes.

 Cameron West – arrangement, French horn
 Christopher Daly – production, arrangement (7)
 Rami Dahdal – arrangement
 Kiley Lotz – backing vocals
 Adele Stein – cello
 New Paltz BTTMs Choir – choir (5)
 Travis DeJong – engineering
 Isabel Gleicher – flute
 Jamal Ruhe – mastering, guitar
 Chris Hopkins – soprano vocals
 Nicolas Davis – trumpet
 Sarah Haines – viola
 Jennifer Hinkle – bass trombone

Charts

References

2017 albums
Pwr Bttm albums
Polyvinyl Record Co. albums
Big Scary Monsters Recording Company albums